State Route 154 (SR 154) is an east–west state highway in Middle and East Tennessee.

Route description

SR 154 begins in Fentress County just west of Jamestown at a junction with SR 52. The highway enters Jamestown on W Cove Road, where it passes by the Fentress County Fairgrounds, before following the original alignment of US 127/SR 28 (N Main Street) for a short distance and turning right onto Pickett Park Highway and going further northeast to cross the current US 127. It continues northeast through rural countryside to pass through Sharp Place, where it has an intersection with SR 297, before crossing into the easternmost part of Pickett County, and traverses Pickett State Park and Pickett State Forest. It then goes into the northwesternmost corner of Scott County before becoming Kentucky Route 167 at the state line in Wayne County, Kentucky.

Major intersections

See also

References 

154
Transportation in Fentress County, Tennessee
Transportation in Pickett County, Tennessee
Transportation in Scott County, Tennessee